The Fasci di Azione Rivoluzionaria, abbreviated FAR, was an Italian neofascist paramilitary organization founded in 1946.  FAR was the first neofascist group in Italy which led an armed struggle after the collapse of the Fascist Regime.

Members 
 Pino Romualdi
 Cesco Giulio Baghino
 Cesco Giulio Baghino
 Francesco Petronio
 Roberto Mieville

New FAR 
The New FAR also known as Legione Nera was founded in 1951 in Rome.  Its members carried out armed attacks against Ministry of Foreign Affairs and US Embassy in Rome.

Members of the New FAR
 Pino Rauti
 Enzo Erra

Italian traditionalist philosopher Julius Evola was arrested in 1951 and tried. He was a suspected to be an ideologist of the FAR.

See also
 Werwolf
 Right-wing terrorism in Italy
 Years of Lead (Italy)

References

Bibliography
 Congolani, G. (1996) La destra in armi: fascisti italiani tra ribellismo ed eversione, Roma, Editori Riuniti
 Rao, N. (2006) La Fiamma e la celtica, Milano, Sperling & Kupfer, 
 Tedeschi, M. (1950) Fascisti dopo Mussolini, Roma, Edizioni Arnia
 Julius Evola, Autodifesa, Roma, Edizioni Fondazione Julius Evola, 1976.

Neo-fascist terrorism
Neo-fascist organisations in Italy
Defunct organisations designated as terrorist in Italy